Sesto Calende is a town and comune located in the province of Varese, in the Lombardy region of northern Italy.

It is at the southern tip of Lake Maggiore, where the Ticino River starts to flow towards the Po River. The main historical sight is the Abbey of San Donato, built in the 9th and 10th centuries. It houses a painting by Bernardino Zenale (1503).

References

External links

Cities and towns in Lombardy
Populated places on the Ticino (river)